Alex Storozynski (born 1961) is an American author and was the President and executive director of The Kosciuszko Foundation. He shared a Pulitzer Prize for Editorial Writing in 1999 as a member of the editorial board of New York Daily News.

Early life and education
Storozynski was born in a Polish neighborhood in Greenpoint, New York in 1961. His parents Dionizy and Irena Storożyński emigrated to the United States from Poland. After World War II they settled in London.

Storozynski has a B.A. in political science from the State University of New York at New Paltz, where he was involved in the Model United Nations program, and interned for the Legislative Gazette.  He earned an M.S. from the Columbia University Graduate School of Journalism.

He was also a post graduate fellow at the University of Warsaw in Poland.

Career

Starting in 1988, Storozynski worked as an editor in New York City, first at the Queens Chronicle, and later for the Empire State Report, based in Albany, New York.  In 1993, he became a press secretary, serving the New York State Thruway Authority, the New York State Canal Corporation, and the New York Attorney General.

Storozynski was a member of the New York Daily News editorial board, starting in 1996. In 1999, the editorial board was awarded a Pulitzer Prize for Editorial Writing for "its effective campaign to rescue Harlem's Apollo Theatre from the financial mismanagement that threatened the landmark's survival".

He was the founding editor of amNewYork.  He later was the city editor of the New York Sun. He has also been published in the European edition of The Wall Street Journal, Chicago Tribune, The New York Post, Newsday and other publications.

He was a chairman of the Polish-Slavic Federal Credit Union Board of Directors.

In November 2008, he was elected President of The Kosciuszko Foundation. As of July 2016, he became chairman of the Board of Trustees of that Foundation.

His biography of Kosciuszko, The Peasant Prince: Thaddeus Kosciuszko and the Age of Revolution, was published in 2009 by St. Martin's Press, winning several awards, including the 2010 Fraunces Tavern Museum Book Award and the Knights Templar Military History Award, the "Military Order of Saint Louis."

Storozynski's essay "From Serfdom to Freedom: Polish Catholics Find A Refuge," was published in the book Catholics in New York, Society Culture, and Politics, 1808–1946, to coincide with the exhibit on Catholics at the Museum of the City of New York.

In September 2011, Polish President Bronislaw Komorowski awarded Storozynski with the Officer's Cross of the Order of Merit of the Republic of Poland.

In February 2012, Nobel Peace Prize Winner, President Lech Walesa awarded Storozynski with the Lech Walesa Media Award.

References

 
 
 
 
 
 

1961 births
Living people
American people of Polish descent
State University of New York at New Paltz alumni
Columbia University Graduate School of Journalism alumni
Pulitzer Prize for Editorial Writing winners
Officers of the Order of Merit of the Republic of Poland
Editors of New York City newspapers
Historians of Polish Americans
Historians from New York (state)